Grace & Talent  is the fourth studio album by Nigerian singer Duncan Mighty. It was released on December 17, 2014.

Background

The 16-track album has a running time of sixty-seven minutes and seventeen seconds.
The album featured Phyno, Olamide, KING STUNNA, J Flex, Noren and TickLips.

Track listing

See also

 List of 2014 albums
 Music of Port Harcourt

References 

2014 albums
Duncan Mighty albums